The St. John's Lutheran Church of Orange, California is a Lutheran church. The church was founded in 1882, and its sanctuary was built in 1913-14. The building was renovated and rededicated in 1990.

The congregation now has more than 4,000 members and a school with 800 students.

Architecture
The church was designed by architect Frederick Eley in the Gothic Revival style. Among the church's distinctive features are sixteen stained glass panels, depicting biblical scenes. The church also has a statue of Jesus in  front of the church, behind the altar.

St. John's Lutheran Church was entered in the National Register of Historic Places on October 16, 1991.

See also
National Register of Historic Places listings in Orange County, California

References

External links

Buildings and structures in Orange, California
Gothic Revival church buildings in California
Lutheran churches in California
National Register of Historic Places in Orange County, California
Churches on the National Register of Historic Places in California
Churches completed in 1914
Churches in Orange County, California
1882 establishments in California